Luria is a genus of sea snails, marine gastropod molluscs in the subfamily Luriinae of the family Cypraeidae, the cowries.

Species
Species within the genus Luria include:
 Luria cahuzaci Dolin & Lozouet, 2004 †
 Luria castinea Dolin & Lozouet, 2004 †
 Luria chattica Dolin & Lozouet, 2004 †
Luria cinerea Gmelin, 1791)
Luria controversa Gray, 1824
 Luria diluviana (Gray, 1824) †
 Luria dockeryi Dolin & Lozouet, 2004 †
 Luria fossula (Ingram, 1947) †
 Luria grateloupi (d'Orbigny, 1852) †
 Luria hieroglyphica (Schilder, 1923) †
Luria isabella (Linnaeus, 1758)
 Luria isabellamexicana (Stearns, 1893)
Luria lurida (Linnaeus, 1758)
 Luria pelouaensis Dolin & Lozouet, 2004 †
 Luria pseudotalpa Dolin & Lozouet, 2004 †
Luria pulchra (Gray, 1824)
 Luria taurorotunda (Sacco, 1894) †
 Luria tessellata (Swainson, 1822)
Species brought into synonymy
Luria gilvella Lorenz, 2002: synonym of Luria isabella (Linnaeus, 1758)

References

External links

Cypraeidae
Gastropod genera